When the Meadows Blossom (Swedish: När ängarna blommar) is a 1946 Swedish drama film directed by Hampe Faustman and starring Sigurd Wallén, Dagny Lind and Birger Malmsten. The film's sets were designed by the art director P.A. Lundgren.

Cast
 Sigurd Wallén as Hellman
 Dagny Lind as 	Mrs. Hellman
 Birger Malmsten as 	Gunnar Hellman
 Ludde Gentzel as 	Nicklasson
 Elsa Widborg as 	Emma Nicklasson
 Doris Svedlund as Ester Nicklasson
 Åke Fridell as 	Emil Nicklasson
 Carl Ström as 	From
 Märta Arbin as 	Mrs. From
 Erik Hell as 	Stenström
 Hugo Björne as 	Squire
 Solveig Lagström as Squire's daughter
Tord Stål as 	Berg
 Magnus Kesster as Lindstam
 Ivar Wahlgren as Andersson
 Sture Ericson as 	Svensson
 Hampe Faustman as 	Ville
 Bengt Eklund as 	Jonte

References

Bibliography 
 Sundholm, John . Historical Dictionary of Scandinavian Cinema. Scarecrow Press, 2012.

External links 
 

1946 films
Swedish drama films
1946 drama films
1940s Swedish-language films
Films directed by Hampe Faustman
1940s Swedish films